Radwan may refer to:

People
Radwan (name) and Redwan, People with the name and surname
Fakhr al-Mulk Radwan, Seljuk ruler of Aleppo from 1095 to 1113.
Ridwan dynasty, dynastic family that governed Gaza and various provinces throughout the Ottoman Empire between the 16th-17th centuries

Places
Radwan, Łódź Voivodeship, a village in central Poland
Radwan, Lesser Poland Voivodeship, a village in south Poland
Radwan, Świętokrzyskie Voivodeship, a village in south-central Poland
Sheikh Radwan, Gaza

Others
Radwan coat of arms, a Polish knights' clan and coat-of-arms
Redwan Force, Hezbollah's special forces

See also 

 Radvaň (disambiguation)